Sukhov (from сухой meaning dry) is a Russian masculine surname, its feminine counterpart is Sukhova. It may refer to:

Aleksandr Sukhov (born 1986), Russian football player
Fyodor Sukhov, protagonist of the 1970 Soviet movie White Sun of the Desert
Mikhail Sukhov (born 1984), Russian football player
Pavel Sukhov (born 1988), Russian fencer
 Sergei Mikhailovich Sukhov (born 1965), Soviet and Russian football player

Russian-language surnames